The 80-20 Initiative, officially the 80-20 Political Action Committee, Incorporated, is a national political organization seeking equal opportunity for Asian Americans through a bloc vote: to unite 80% of the Asian American voters behind the presidential candidate who best represents the interests of Asian Americans.  Hence, the name, 80-20.  It claims to be a non-partisan and an independent swing voting bloc.

History
The "Asia Gate" of 1996-97, which was an alleged effort by the People's Republic of China to influence domestic American politics, sowed the seed for Asian American political empowerment.  Frustrated by what he viewed to be the political exploitation of Asian American’s naïveté as evidenced by “Asia Gate”, Dr. S.B. Woo, former Lieutenant Governor of Delaware, set out to organize support to prevent its recurrence. In the foreword of the book, Click on Democracy, he related his disappointment with the media, the Democratic and Republican Parties for misrepresenting and misusing Asian Americans, and his despair over the Asian American community’s inaction and its failure to defend itself, rooted in its lack of political maturity and cohesiveness.

As a former politician, Dr. S. B. Woo believed that in order to defend themselves, Asian Americans must develop enough political clout, to reward politicians who cared for their rightful concerns and to punish those who didn't. To communicate effectively with all Asian Americans and to forge a bloc vote, he harnessed the power of the Internet. Dr. S. B. Woo, together with several other Asian American leaders, including Dr. Larry Y. Ho Professor of two endowed Chairs at Harvard University; Henry S. Tang, Chairman of the Committee of 100; and Dr. Chang-Lin Tien, Chancellor of the University of California, Berkeley, compiled an e-mail list of 300 like-minded individuals who donated $50,000 to pursue their vision.  On September 26–27, 1998, in a meeting in Foster City, California, 80-20 was born.

Acquiring political clout 
Led by Dr. S. B. Woo who provided the organization with his political acumen, supported by unpaid volunteer Board members and officers, and armed with an e-mail list of voters which grew to 700,000, 80-20 claims to have organized the Asian American communities to achieve swing bloc votes for its endorsed candidates to win equal opportunity and justice for all Asian Americans.  80-20 was rated one of the US's two most effective cyberspace political organizations in the 2000 election.  Any US citizen or permanent resident, upon paying their membership dues, can become a member of 80-20.  Currently, 80-20 has about 3,150 members.

Endorsement of presidential candidates
80-20 holds its Endorsement Convention in the year of a presidential election, after candidates for both the Republican and Democratic Party have been determined. Each delegate to the convention is an unpaid volunteer who pledges in writing to advocate for 80-20’s endorsed candidate.  The delegates are one third each of Democrats, Republicans, and Independents, all elected by dues-paying members, to ensure an objective nonpartisan deliberation.

In the 2004 and 2008 elections, 80-20's main criterion for endorsement was the response to 80-20's questionnaire by the presidential candidates. In both years, while the Democratic candidates for President answered 80-20's questionnaire with all affirmative responses (after 80-20 revised the questions by request of the candidates), the Republican candidates did not respond to the questionnaire at all. 80-20 had initially issued a "call to action" to defeat Obama, citing "almost farcical reasons why he would not reply to OUR questionnaire". The call to action has since been deleted from the organization's sites.

80-20 has endorsed the Democratic candidate in the 2000, 2004, 2008, 2012, 2016 and 2020 presidential elections.

Delivering swing bloc votes
Once 80-20 endorses a candidate, it organizes Asian American bloc votes for its endorsed candidate, relying partly on volunteers, ethnic media radio, print and TV ads; and mostly on its e-mail communication with its 700,000 Asian American supporters, their families and their friends.

Breaking the glass ceiling
Based on publicly available government statistics, Asian Americans have the lowest chance of rising to management when compared with blacks, Hispanics and women in spite of having the highest educational attainment.

80-20 compiled these data which has been verified in writing by the Chief Statistician of EEOC, Ronald Edwards, into charts; and on September 6, 2006, 80-20 took out a full page Ad in The Washington Post in effort to educate the general public.

Subsequently, the ad was read into the Congressional Record by Senator Tom Carper of Delaware.

Executive Order 11246 signed into law in 1965, requires equal employment opportunity and prohibits discrimination. This law has been enforced for all except Asian Americans, as evidence by the low glass ceiling still hanging over this ethnic minority. Prior to election 2008, in its effort to shatter this glass ceiling, 80-20 obtained written commitments from nine of the eleven Democratic Presidential candidates, including then Senator Barack Obama and Senator Joe Biden, to enforce EO 11246 for All Asian Americans.

Asian American judges 
While Asian Americans make up 5% of the US population in 2008, only eight of the 867 (less than 1%) Article III Federal judges are Asian Americans.

During the 2008 presidential campaign, to remedy the underrepresentation of Asian Americans in the Federal judiciary, 80-20 sent out a questionnaire to all the presidential candidates. Senator Obama and Senator Biden responded and promised in writing to increase the appointment of Asian American federal judges.

By June 2010, President Obama has nominated six Asian Americans to a seat on the U.S. District Court, including Judge Jacqueline Nguyen and Dolly M. Gee for the United States District Court for the Central District of California, and Judges Edward M. Chen and Lucy H. Koh for the United States District Court for the Northern District of California,  Edmond Chang for the United States District Court for the Northern District of Illinois, and Judge Leslie E. Kobayashi for United States District Court for the District of Hawaii.

On October 6, 2009, President Obama nominated Judge Denny Chin to a seat on the U.S. Courts of Appeals in the Second Circuit, the first Asian American Appeals court judge to be nominated since 1996, more than 12 years ago. This was followed on February 24, 2010 by the nomination of Goodwin H. Liu to a seat on the U.S. Courts of Appeals in the Ninth Circuit.

As of December 18, 2010, all of the above nominations have been confirmed by the Senate except for the nominations of Edward Chen and Goodwin Liu.

Edward Chen was confirmed on May 10, 2011 to the U.S. District Court for the Northern District of California.

On May 25, 2011, in a letter to President Barack Obama, Goodwin Liu withdrew his nomination for the 9th Circuit Court of Appeals.

Anti-racial attack
In the 2002 primary election, there were two racist attacks against Asian American candidates by their political opponents. As a result, 80-20 passed a resolution, aiming to stop such attacks.

Local chapters
80-20 currently has a strategy to expand its influence and to encourage Asian Americans to be involved in local politics by establishing local chapters. Two local chapters have been established recently: the Detroit-Ann Arbor Area Chapter and the Great Washington DC Area (DC, MD, and VA) Chapter.

References

External links

1998 establishments in the United States
Asian-American organizations
Organizations established in 1998
Political advocacy groups in the United States
United States political action committees